Tone Beate Mostraum (born 9 December 1974) is a Norwegian actress. She graduated from  the Norwegian National Academy of Theatre in 1999, and has since acted both at Trøndelag Teater and at the National Theatre, in roles such as Nora in Henrik Ibsen's play A Doll's House, and Torunn in Anne B. Ragde's Berlinerpoplene. She became known to a national audience through her role as Randi in the television series Svarte penger, hvite løgner in 2004,  Kampen for tilværelsen in 2014,  and Presten in 2017.   She also starred in Joachim Trier's Oslo, August 31st in 2011.

References

External links

Biography from Nationaltheateret.
Biography from Trøndelag Teater.

1974 births
Living people
Norwegian television actresses
Norwegian stage actresses
Oslo National Academy of the Arts alumni